Garden Party is a 2008 American drama film directed by Jason Freeland, and starring Vinessa Shaw and Willa Holland. A low-budget independent film, it marked Jennifer Lawrence's film debut.

Cast
 Vinessa Shaw as Sally St. Claire
 Willa Holland as April
 Richard Gunn as Todd
 Patrick Fischler as Anthony
 Fiona Dourif as Becky
 Erik Smith as Sammy
 Alexander Cendese as Nathan
 Ross Patterson as Joey Zane
 Jordan Havard as Wayne
 Christopher Allport as Davey Diamond
 Jeffrey R. Newman as Carlos
 Jennifer Lawrence as Tiff
 Carrie Finklea as Lost Girl

References

External links
 
 
 

2008 films
2000s teen drama films
American independent films
American teen drama films
Films scored by John Swihart
Films shot in Los Angeles
Roadside Attractions films
2008 drama films
2000s English-language films
2000s American films